Iveta Benešová and Barbora Záhlavová-Strýcová were the defending champions, but they lost in the first round against Maria Elena Camerin and Darya Kustova.
In the final, Bethanie Mattek-Sands and Meghann Shaughnessy defeated Vera Dushevina and Ekaterina Makarova 6–4, 6–2.

Seeds

  Liezel Huber /  Nadia Petrova (first round)
  Iveta Benešová /  Barbora Záhlavová-Strýcová (first round)
  Bethanie Mattek-Sands /  Meghann Shaughnessy (champions)
  Natalie Grandin /  Vladimíra Uhlířová (first round)

Main draw

Draw

References
 Main Draw

Open GDF Suez
Doubles 2011